Nikola Stojčevski (born 9 August 1984) is a retired Macedonian handball player.

References
http://24rakomet.mk/?p=37878
http://www.g-sport.mk/vest-statija/64968/stojchevski-ja-zavrshi-karierata

1984 births
Living people
Macedonian male handball players
Redbergslids IK players
People from Resen, North Macedonia
Macedonian expatriate sportspeople in Sweden
Macedonian expatriate sportspeople in Turkey
Macedonian expatriate sportspeople in Romania
Macedonian expatriate sportspeople in Croatia
Expatriate sportspeople in Sweden
Expatriate handball players in Turkey 
Expatriate sportspeople in Croatia